Newbury Town F.C. is a now-defunct football club based in Newbury, England. During their long history, they twice won the Hellenic League and in 1994 they won Division 2 of the Isthmian League and reached the Quarter-Finals of the national FA Vase, but within a year had ceased to exist. Since then there have been two successor clubs playing at the same venue.

Club history

Newbury Town were founded in 1887 and initially played only friendly fixtures. In the 1890s they began entering the FA Cup, where they were defeated 0–14 by Southampton at the Antelope Ground in the 1894–95 season. However, during this time Newbury recorded plenty of success locally as they won the numerous Berks & Bucks Cups, including the Senior Cup in 1897–98.

After playing at several different locations within the town, the club settled at Faraday Road but all throughout their existence faced numerous problems such as lease renewals and property development, not to mention problems with the actual pitch itself.

In 1904 Newbury Town joined the Great Western League where they remained until 1927 when they joined the Hampshire League where they remained for just one season before entering the Reading League. Here the club would become a powerful force, winning the league title five times as well as the Reading Senior Cup in 1931–32. In 1952 Newbury stepped up to the now defunct Metropolitan League where they would play for seven seasons, and won the cup which was presented to the highest scoring amateur team in the league, five times. The club was managed by a former professional left back, Les Gaunt, who previously played for Leeds United and Reading.

A tough season in 1961–62 saw Newbury transfer to the Hellenic League, where they took the place of their Reserves who had joined the league as founder members in 1953. Here they soon got back on track and twice won the League Cup in 1959–60 and 1968–69.

After relocating the pitch and make numerous ground improvements, the 1970s saw Newbury's fortunes take off. They twice won the Hellenic League title in 1977–78 and 1980–81 (also finishing runners-up in 1977–78). In 1982 the club switched to the now defunct Athenian League and again enjoyed great success, winning the league title at the first attempt. During this time Newbury enjoyed several good runs in the national cup competitions. In 1979–80 they reached Round 5 of the FA Vase and the following season reached the 3rd Qualifying Round of the FA Cup.

In 1983 Newbury made a successful application to join Division 2 of the expanding Isthmian League and here they held down a comfortable mid-table position for a number of seasons. In 1993–94 Newbury had a fine season as they won promotion as champions and reached the Quarter Finals of the FA Vase where they were knocked out 0–2 by Taunton Town.

The success was short-lived, as they were relegated straight back the following season and, tragically, worse was to follow in the summer of 1995 when a severe financial crisis forced the club to withdraw from the competition and fold.

Honours
Isthmian League Division 2
Champions 1993/94
Athenian League
Champions 1982/83
Hellenic League Premier Division
Champions 1978/79 & 1980/81
Hellenic League Cup
Winners 1959/60 & 1968/69
Reading League
Champions 5 times
Berks & Bucks Senior Cup
Winners
Reading Senior Cup
Winners 1931/32

Playing records

League history 1952-95

FA Cup (Post War)

FA Trophy

FA Vase

Successor clubs

Football soon returned to Faraday Road when in 1996 a new club, A.F.C. Newbury was formed. This new club was formed from three different local teams along with the ashes of the defunct Town club and took the place of the ambitious Ecchinswell in Division 1 of the Hampshire League and within a year had won promotion to the Wessex League where they would enjoy great success. Sadly 10 years later history would repeat itself as they too would suffer badly from financial and ground problems and after being demoted from the league's top flight they folded and withdrew from the competition early in the 2006–07 season.

Football still continues at Faraday Road today as upon taking up residence in 2006, Reading League side Old London Apprentice FC changed their name to Newbury F.C. In 2007–08 they won promotion to Division 1 East of the Hellenic League. They have since taken the previous clubs youth sides under their umbrella and are ambitious to progress further.

References

External links
Newbury Town League Record  –  http://www.fchd.info/NEWBURYT.HTM
Stadium Aerial View – http://wikimapia.org/52664/

Association football clubs disestablished in 1995
Defunct football clubs in England
Isthmian League
Metropolitan League
Athenian League
1887 establishments in England
1995 disestablishments in England
Association football clubs established in 1887
Defunct football clubs in Berkshire
Great Western Suburban League
Sport in Newbury, Berkshire